The Order of Propitious Clouds is a civilian order of the Republic of China (Taiwan). The center of the medal features a picture of clouds, as a token of auspiciousness. This order was instituted in 1941 and classified into nine ranks. As with other orders, both citizens of the Republic of China and foreigners can be awarded the Order of Propitious Clouds.

History
The Order of Propitious Clouds was awarded to twenty persons between 1943 and March 1945.

Classes

Recipients

 Edvard Beneš, President of Czechoslovakia
 P. W. Botha, State President of South Africa
Raymond F. Burghardt, Director of the American Institute in Taiwan
 Avila Camacho, President of Mexico
 Morris Chang, founder and former CEO of Taiwan Semiconductor Manufacturing Company (TSMC)
 Chiang Kai-shek, president of the Republic of China
 Fredrick Chien, President of Control Yuan
 José Figueres Ferrer, President of Costa Rica
 Timothy Harris, Prime Minister of Saint Kitts and Nevis
 Jesse Helms, U.S. Senator from North Carolina
 Nobusuke Kishi, prime minister of Japan
 Jaroslav Kubera, in memoriam, President of the Senate of the Czech Republic
 Lin Chuan, Premier of the Republic of China
 Eva Macapagal, First Lady of the Philippines
 Park Chung-hee, South Korean president
 Ileana Ros-Lehtinen, Member of the U.S. House of Representatives from Florida's 27th district
 Shih Chi-yang, President of the Judicial Yuan
 Queen mother Sirikit of Thailand
 Hermann Otto Solms, German Father of the House of the Bundestag
 Hassan bin Talal, Jordanian Prince
 Jose Villannueva, Dominican Ambassador to the Republic of China
 Wang Ginn-wang, Minister of the Coast Guard Administration (Taiwan)
 Yin Shun, Buddhist monk and scholar
 Alain Richard, French Senator and former Minister of Defense
 Luis Castiglioni, Paraguayan Minister of Industry and Commerce and former vice-president of Paraguay
 Nancy Pelosi, Speaker of the U.S. House of Representatives
 Jean Robert Pitte, perpetual secretary of the Academy of Moral and Political Sciences under the Institut de France
 Shinzo Abe, Prime minister of Japan

See also
 Song to the Auspicious Cloud

References

External links 

Orders, decorations, and medals of the Republic of China
Awards established in 1941